Wilfred Vickers (3 August 1924 – September 1984) was an English professional footballer who played as a forward in the Football League for Brighton & Hove Albion and Aldershot. He was on the books of West Bromwich Albion without appearing at first-team level, and went on to play non-league football for clubs including Bentley Colliery and Gainsborough Trinity.

References

1924 births
1984 deaths
Footballers from Wakefield
English footballers
Association football forwards
Brighton & Hove Albion F.C. players
West Bromwich Albion F.C. players
Aldershot F.C. players
Bentley Colliery F.C. players
Gainsborough Trinity F.C. players
English Football League players
Midland Football League players